Giuseppe Francica-Nava de Bontifè (23 July 1846—7 December 1928) was an Italian Cardinal of the Catholic Church who served as Archbishop of Catania from 1895 until his death, and was elevated to the cardinalate in 1899.

Biography
Francica-Nava de Bontifè was born in Catania, Sicily, and received the Sacrament of Confirmation in March 1849. He studied at the seminary in Caltanissetta, from where he obtained his licentiate in theology, and then went to Rome to study at the Pontifical Gregorian University, earning his doctorates in theology, philosophy, and civil and canon law.

Francica was ordained to the priesthood on 22 May 1869. During his studies at the Pontifical Academy of Ecclesiastical Nobles (1870-1880), he served as rector of the Caltanissetta seminary for three years, becoming the pro-vicar general (1877) and later full vicar general of the diocese. After becoming an honorary canon of the diocese's cathedral chapter, he was raised to the rank of Privy Chamberlain of His Holiness in 1876 and Domestic Prelate of His Holiness on 4 March 1879.

On 9 August 1883, Francica was appointed Auxiliary Bishop of Caltanissetta and Titular Bishop of Alabanda by Pope Leo XIII, receiving his episcopal consecration on the following 21 October from Bishop Giovanni Guttadauro di Reburdone. He was promoted to Titular Archbishop of Heraclea on 24 May 1889, and later named Apostolic Nuncio to Belgium on 6 June 1889, Archbishop of Catania on 18 March 1895 as well as Apostolic Nuncio to Spain on 6 August 1896.

Pope Leo created him Cardinal-Priest of Ss. Giovanni e Paolo in the consistory of 19 June 1899. Francica participated in the conclaves of 1903, 1914, and 1922, and also served as Cardinal Protopriest (the longest-serving member of the order of Cardinal Priests) from 19 November 1924 until his death.

Cardinal Francica-Nava de Bontifè died in Catania, at the age of 82. He is buried in the metropolitan cathedral of the same.

See also
Cardinal electors in Papal conclave, 1914
Cardinal electors in Papal conclave, 1922

External links
Cardinals of the Holy Roman Church
Catholic-Hierarchy

1846 births
1928 deaths
Bishops of Catania
20th-century Italian cardinals
Cardinals created by Pope Leo XIII
19th-century Italian Roman Catholic archbishops
20th-century Italian Roman Catholic archbishops
Pontifical Gregorian University alumni
Pontifical Ecclesiastical Academy alumni